USAPL may refer to:

USA Pool League
USA Powerlifting